Vingtaine des Quennevais (Jèrriais: "La Vîngtaine des Tchennevais") is the largest of the four vingtaines of the Parish of St. Brélade in Jersey in the Channel Islands.

Together with the Vingtaine de la Moye it forms part of "St. Brélade No. 2 district" and elects two Deputies.

Sport 
Les Quennevais Rugby Football Club is named after the vingtaine.

This vingtaine also contains Les Quennevais Sports Centre, which has the only other public swimming pool in Jersey apart from Aquasplash in St Helier.

References

External links
 Les Quennevais RFC
 Les Quennevais Sports Centre

Quennevais
Saint Brélade